μ Fornacis (Latinised as Mu Fornacis) is the Bayer designation for a star in the southern constellation of Fornax. With an apparent visual magnitude of 5.27, it is visible to the naked eye. The distance to this star, as determined by its annual parallax shift of 10.18 mas, is around 320 light years.

This is an A-type main sequence star with a stellar classification of A0 V. It is a Be star that displays "central quasi emission" (CQE) bumps in its spectrum due to a surrounding shell of material. The star has an estimated 3.1 times the mass of the Sun and 2.5 times the Sun's radius. Mu Fornacis is spinning rapidly with a projected rotational velocity of 320 km/s and is around 188 million years old. It radiates 68.7 times the solar luminosity from its outer atmosphere at an effective temperature of 11,745 K.

Mu Fornacis appears to be emitting an infrared excess at a wavelength of 22 μm, which could be due to an orbiting debris disk.

References

A-type main-sequence stars
Be stars
Circumstellar disks
Fornax (constellation)
Fornacis, Lambda
CD-31 882
013709
10320
652
0089